Whitfield is a hamlet to the south of Glossop in the High Peak district of Derbyshire, England. The hamlet contains 14 listed buildings that are recorded in the National Heritage List for England.  All the listed buildings are designated at Grade II, the lowest of the three grades, which is applied to "buildings of national importance and special interest". Apart from a well, all the listed buildings are houses, some of which have been converted from buildings with other original uses.


Buildings

References

Citations

Sources

 

Lists of listed buildings in Derbyshire